The Blake House was a historic house at 211 Southeast A Street in Bentonville, Arkansas.  It was a two-story wood frame duplex, with entirely vernacular styling, except for a Craftsman-style porch (with tapered square columns set on stone piers) added in the 20th century.  The house, estimated to have been built in the 1880s, was a remarkably well-preserved example of a once-numerous building type in the city.

The house was listed on the National Register of Historic Places in 1988.  It has been demolished, and was delisted in 2018.

See also
National Register of Historic Places listings in Benton County, Arkansas

References

Houses on the National Register of Historic Places in Arkansas
Houses completed in 1885
Houses in Bentonville, Arkansas
National Register of Historic Places in Bentonville, Arkansas
Demolished buildings and structures in Arkansas
Former National Register of Historic Places in Arkansas
1885 establishments in Arkansas